There was no Open Championship held in 1933, the defending champion F. D. Amr Bey of Egypt was busy defending his Amateur championship whilst defending professional champion Don Butcher resisted a challenge from Jim Dear. This professional challenge determined who would meet Bey in 1934 for the Open Championship.
The result of the professional championship challenge is below.

Results

First Leg

Second Leg

References

Men's British Open Squash Championships
Men's British Open Squash Championship
Men's British Open Squash Championship
Men's British Open Squash Championship
Men's British Open Squash Championship
Squash competitions in London